Plymouth Parkway Football Club is a football club based in Plymouth, Devon, England.

History
The club was originally formed by Stuart Cadmore in 1988 when a group of players left the youth team Plymouth Kolts and joined the Plymouth & District League in Division 4. In that same year the club secured sponsorship from Exeter Airport, and as part of that deal they changed their name to Ex-Air Flyers. They were the first club in Plymouth to be sponsored from outside the city limits. The club colours of yellow and blue are from the colours of the airport logo and remain the same today.

In their first season the club gained promotion and then moved the Parkway Sports Club. The club carried on to be promoted in successive seasons until it reached Division one and was waiting to join the Premier Division when the Devon League was formed in 1992. The club decided to apply to become members of the Devon League instead as the Parkway Sports Club had sufficient facilities to join the league. The club was accepted into the league but the club had to change its name, so they became known as EAF Plymouth FC.

Before the 1993–94 season the Sports Club offered a number of extra facilities and help to the club, so the club changed their name to Plymouth Parkway FC. Five seasons later in 1998 the club left the Devon league to join the South Western League. On the eve of the 2000–01 season the club became homeless with the loss of the Parkway Sports Club due to a disagreement over the terms of the lease and subsequent maintenance costs. As a result, and with special permission from the league, the club spent that season having to play all of its games away from home. During their build up to the 2001/02 season the club announced they would be developing an area of Manadon as their new ground, to be known as Bolitho Park. While work was being completed, with controversial assistance from Plymouth City Council, they used The Brickfields athletics ground in Devonport, before they moved to their new and current home in August 2003.

In the 2006–07 season the club entered the FA Vase for the first time, making it to the second qualifying round in their first attempt. A season later the club became founding members of the South West Peninsula League, when the South Western Football League and the Devon County Football League merged.

In the summer of 2016, Parkway merged with Plymouth and West Devon Football League club Bar Sol Ona, whose team became the Parkway Reserves in the East Cornwall League. It is here where Parkway get the design for their FC Barcelona-esque away kit from.

At some later date, the club was promoted to the Southern League.

Ground

Plymouth Parkway play their games at Bolitho Park (Stadio Bolithio), St. Peters Road, Plymouth, PL5 3JG. The ground has floodlights, a clubhouse, and has a capacity of 3500 standing and two covered seating areas for around 250 people.

Current squad

Honours
 Pitching In Southern League Division One South:
Winners (1): 2021–22
Les Phillips Cup
Winners (1): 2018-19
 South West Peninsula League Premier Division:
Winners (1): 2013–14, 2017–18
Runners-up (2): 2008–09, 2012–13
 Plymouth & District League Division 2:
Winners (1): 1990–91
 Throgmorton cup
Winners (1): 2010–11 2013-14
 Devon Premier Cup:
Runners-up (3): 2003–04, 2004–05, 2005–06
 Plymouth & District League Division 3 Cup:
Runners-up (1): 1989–90
 Plymouth & District League Division 4 Cup:
Winners (1): 1988–89
 George Gillin Trophy:
Winners (1): 2001–02
Runners-up (2): 1997–98, 2002–03
 Stafford Williams Trophy:
Runners-up (2): 2000–01, 2001–02
 Charity Bowl:
Winners (1): 2014-15
 Edenvale Turf St Luke's Bowl:
Winners (1):  2013–14, 2017-2018

Records

Highest League Position: 1st in Pitching In Southern League Division One South 2021-22
FA Cup best performance: Third Qualifying Round, 2022–23
FA Trophy best performance: Fourth round, 2021–22
FA Vase best performance: Quarter-finals, 2019–20
Highest League attendance: 1363 vs Cinderford Town, April 23, 2022

Club officials and staff

See also
Plymouth Parkway F.C. players

References

External links
Plymouth Parkway Official Website

Football clubs in England
Sport in Plymouth, Devon
Football clubs in Devon
1988 establishments in England
Association football clubs established in 1988
South West Peninsula League
Western Football League
Southern Football League clubs